Ottowia shaoguanensis is a Gram-negative and short rod-shaped bacterium from the genus Ottowia which has been isolated from wastewater from Shaoguan in China.

References

Comamonadaceae
Bacteria described in 2014